Kallody is a village in the Edavaka Grama panchayath of the Wayanad district, Kerala, India. This village falls under the Mananthavady Taluk. The Hill Highway (Kerala) SH-59 passes through this village town.

Kallody is home to the St. George Forane Church Kallody, Wayanad and Chowayil Bhagavathy Temple.

History

This land was divided into Edavaka and Edachena "desam". The house of Edachena Kunkan, one of the commanders of Pazhassi Raja, was located in this area.

Kallody was mainly a place where people migrated from different parts of the central-south Kerala, especially from the area such as Kottayam, Thodupuzha, and Moovattupuzha starting from the year of 1940. Vettiyankal, Mathai was the first migrant to Kallody. He invited several other migrants to Mananthavady to the Kallody area. The Nadukunnel family was one of the first families migrated from Pala to Kallody.

Etymology

The word Kallody is derived from the Malayalam words kallu–കല്ല് (i.e. stone) and ody–ഓടി (i.e. ran), based on a century old tale of this area.

Long ago, the Kallody area was a forest. There was a hill named Choran Kunnu located on the banks of the Mananthavady-Pakranthalam hill pass. Thieves from this area used to attack merchants from Calicut to Mananthavady when they passed this hill pass. To escape from the attacks, the travellers used to carry stones with them and start running from this area. They used to pelt stones to defend from the thieves. Hence, this place named as Kallody.

Education

The Kallody area is served by several Kerala State aided schools and a couple of Anganwadis. The main schools are 
 St. Joseph's Pre-Primary School Kallody
 St. Joseph's Upper-Primary (U.P.) School Kallody
 St. Joseph's High School (H.S.) Kallody
 St. Joseph's Higher Secondary School (H.S.S.) Kallody

Transportation

Kallody is mainly served by the Kerala State Road Transport Corporation (K.S.R.T.C.) buses. Other than the public transport system, Kallody residents use Motor Bikes, Auto rickshaws, or Taxicabs to commute. 

The nearest railway station is in Mysore and the nearest airports are Kozhikode International Airport-120 km, Bengaluru International Airport-290 km, and   Kannur International Airport-58 km.

Points of Interest

 St. George Forane Church Kallody, Wayanad 
 Chowayil Bhagavathy Temple
 The Orapp Bridge 
 Kabini River

See also

 Edavaka
 Kabini River 
 St. George Forane Church Kallody, Wayanad
 Malabar Migration

References

Villages in Wayanad district
Mananthavady Area